M. Fred Bell Speculative Cottage is a historic home located at Fulton, Callaway County, Missouri.  It was designed by Fulton architect Morris Frederick Bell and built in 1893, with additions by Bell built in 1907.  It is a one-story, Queen Anne frame cottage with a Bungalow style front porch and rear addition.  It was restored in the 1990s.

The house was listed on the National Register of Historic Places in 1995.

References 

Houses on the National Register of Historic Places in Missouri
Queen Anne architecture in Missouri
Bungalow architecture in Missouri
Houses completed in 1893
Houses in Callaway County, Missouri
National Register of Historic Places in Callaway County, Missouri